Rasheedia heptacanthi is a parasitic nematode in the genus Rasheedia.  

The species is an intestinal parasite of the Cinnabar goatfish Parupeneus heptacanthus (Mullidae) and Dentex fourmanoiri (Sparidae) off New Caledonia.

The two species Rasheedia heptacanthi and Rasheedia novaecaledoniensis, which both occur in New Caledonian waters, are mainly differentiated by the number of anterior protrusible oesophageal lobes (two in R. heptacanthi and four in R. novaecaledoniensis), structure of the oesophagus and the lengths of their spicules.

Gallery: scanning electron microscopy of Rasheedia heptacanthi

References 

Spirurida
Nematodes described in 2018
Parasitic nematodes of fish
Fauna of New Caledonia